Dr. Walter Broadbent (1868–1951) was an English physician remembered for describing the Broadbent sign of constrictive pericarditis.

Biography 
Walter Broadbent was born in 1868, the son of Sir William Broadbent. He was educated at Harrow School, Trinity College, Cambridge and St Mary's Hospital, London. He graduated in 1893. His first paper, published in 1895, described the Broadbent sign.

References 

19th-century English medical doctors
1868 births
1951 deaths
People educated at Harrow School
Alumni of Trinity College, Cambridge
20th-century English medical doctors
Younger sons of baronets